Change! is the second full-length album by the Black Swans.  It is a follow-up to 2004's  Who Will Walk in the Darkness with You? and their 2006 EP, Sex Brain.  Harp Magazine described the album as a  tip of the hat to Charles Simic, the Left Banke, and Fred Neil.

Cover 
The cover of the CD release is a painting, "Untitled", by Debbie Porchetti, a member of Arc Industries North Workshop, a branch of Franklin County Board of MRDD. The workshop provides services to 300 adults with developmental challenges and recognize their talents by offering an environment that reinforces their confidence and self-expression. Change! was also released in a limited edition vinyl featuring original, one of a kind artwork by workshop members who applied their expression to 500 blank album sleeves.

Track listing

Personnel

Musicians 
 Jerry DeCicca - acoustic guitar, vocals, electric guitar on "Purple Heart"
 Noel Sayre - violin, viola
 Canaan Faulkner - bass, backing vocals
 Chris Forbes - electric guitar, tenor guitar, backing vocals
 Keith Hanlon  drums, percussion
 Amy Alwood - backing vocals
 Joe Peppercorn - piano

Releases

References

External links 
 The Black Swans, official web site

2007 albums
The Black Swans albums